101 Piscium is a star in the zodiac constellation of Pisces, located around 1,400 light years away from the Sun. This appears as a dim, blue-white hued star near the lower limit of visibility to the naked eye at an apparent visual magnitude of 6.23. It is a suspected variable star  with the designation NSV 559; 101 Piscium is the Flamsteed designation. The star is moving closer to the Earth with a heliocentric radial velocity of −10 km/s.

This object has a stellar classification of B9.5 III, matching a giant star that has consumed the hydrogen at its core and is evolving away from the main sequence. It is spinning rapidly with a projected rotational velocity of 246 km/s, compared to a critical velocity of 270 km/s. The star has 4.5 times the mass of the Sun and about 3.6 times the Sun's radius. It is radiating around 1,000 times the luminosity of the Sun from its photosphere at an effective temperature of 10,471 K.

References

External links
sky-map

B-type giants
Suspected variables
Pisces (constellation)
Durchmusterung objects
Piscium, 101
009766
007436
0455